Dhananjay Kannoujia is an Indian politician and a member of 17th Legislative Assembly, Uttar Pradesh of India. He represents the Belthara Road constituency in Ballia district of Uttar Pradesh.

Political career
Dhananjay Kannoujia contested Uttar Pradesh Assembly Election as Bharatiya Janata Party candidate and defeated his close contestant Gorakh Paswan from Samajwadi Party with a margin of 18,319 votes.

Posts held

See also
Uttar Pradesh Legislative Assembly

References

Uttar Pradesh MLAs 2017–2022
Bharatiya Janata Party politicians from Uttar Pradesh
People from Ballia district
1984 births
Living people